The Missouri Society of CPAs (MOCPA) is a professional association for the Certified Public Accountant (CPA) profession in Missouri. The organization was formed on June 18, 1909, by twenty-three CPAs from St. Louis. The Society represents over 8,000 members in the practicing accounting in public practice, industry, government, and education.

References

External links
Official Website
CPA Exam Application Process

Organizations based in Missouri